Stekoa Creek is a stream in the U.S. state of Georgia. It is a tributary to the Chattooga River.

The name Stekoa is Cherokee in origin. Variant names are "Chechero Creek", "Stecoah Creek", and "Sticoa Creek".

References

Rivers of Georgia (U.S. state)
Rivers of Rabun County, Georgia